Bermillo de Sayago is a municipality located in the province of Zamora, Castile and León, Spain. According to the 2009 census (INE), the municipality has a population of 1,259 inhabitants. It works as the territorial capital of Sayago, leading this comarca but with no official status. Its central position and the fact of a clearly higher population have given the town this role. Furthermore, the municipalities association Sayagua has its headquarters in Bermillo. This organization is a mancomunidad that supplies services like recycling or water through the comarca of Sayago that could not be afforded by the so-little towns in the area.

Geographically, its landscape is a peneplain, as the rest of Sayago (except Duero canyons, that are relatively far away Bermillo).

See also 
 Arribes del Duero Natural Park
 Zamora city
 Zamora province

References

Municipalities of the Province of Zamora
Sayago